The Cebu–Cordova Link Expressway (CCLEX), also known as the Cebu–Cordova Bridge and the Third Cebu–Mactan Bridge (or simply, the Third Bridge), is an  toll bridge expressway in Metro Cebu, Philippines. The bridge connects the South Road Properties in Cebu City in mainland Cebu, and Cordova, on Mactan island. Crossing the Mactan Channel, it is the third road link between Cebu and Mactan islands, and the first between Cebu City and Cordova. It is the longest sea-crossing bridge in the Philippines, surpassing the  San Juanico Bridge between Samar and Leyte, as well as Marcelo Fernan Bridge (which also crosses the Mactan Channel) as the longest cable-stayed bridge in the Philippines.

History

Planning
The bridge was first proposed by Cordova mayor Adelino Sitoy to connect his municipality and mainland Cebu in Cebu City. In 2014, an unsolicited proposal was put forth by Metro Pacific Tollways Corporation (MPTC) to build a bridge linking Cebu City and Cordova, which was then under review by a joint venture selection committee between the two local government units. After numerous studies were conducted, the local government units of Cordova and Cebu City entered into a public-private partnership with Metro Pacific Tollways Development Corp. (MPTDC).  The construction of the Cebu–Cordova bridge was lobbied by then chairman of the Regional Development Council of Region VII Michael Rama, who became Mayor of Cebu City when the Cebu–Cordova Bridge project was already awarded to a company.

In January 2016, Cebu Cordova Link Expressway Corporation (CCLEC) signed an agreement on February 7 a 19-billion loan and security bonds with six banks: Development Bank of the Philippines (DBP), Rizal Commercial Banking Corporation (RCBC), Bank of the Philippine Islands (BPI), Robinsons Bank Corporation, Union Bank of the Philippines, and Security Bank Corporation. CCLEC is a subsidiary of Metro Pacific Tollways Development Corp. (MPTDC) will fund the rest of the project, through a disclosure to the Philippine Stock Exchange and by equity or supplemental capital loans from other private and interested parties who want to invest in this project and be one of the stockholders of the said bridge.

MPTDC announced that the construction of the bridge was to commence in 2017. The company in the same announcement said that they will be responsible for the construction and financing of the bridge, as well as its operation once its completed.

Construction and opening
The groundbreaking ceremony for the Cebu–Cordova Bridge was held on March 2, 2017. The expressway was the first venture of MPTDC in the Philippines outside of Luzon.

In 2021, the bridge played a role in that year's Quincentennial Commemorations in the Philippines. As part of the commemorations, eight ecumenical "Iconic Crosses" were placed on the two main pylons of the bridge. The crosses were lighted on April 15, 2021.

The final concrete pouring in the main bridge deck was held on October 5, 2021, effectively completing the main bridge deck.

The bridge was inaugurated by then-Philippine President Rodrigo Duterte on April 27, 2022, coinciding with the 501st anniversary of the Battle of Mactan. It is the first expressway and toll road in the Philippines outside of Luzon. It formally opened to motorists three days later, on April 30, 2022.

Operation
CCLEX is managed by Cebu–Cordova Link Expressway Corporation (CCLEC), a subsidiary of Metro Pacific Tollways Corporation (MPTC), a company of MVP Group of Companies.

Design

The bridge spans  and is the longest and tallest bridge in the Philippines, surpassing the San Juanico Bridge, which crosses Leyte and Samar, and the Candaba Viaduct along the North Luzon Expressway. It was designed by the Spanish firms Carlos Fernandez Casado (CFC) and SENER Ingeniería y Sistemas, while the local firm DCCD Engineering Corporation and the Danish firm COWI are the owner's engineers. The bridge is being built by a joint venture between Spanish firm Acciona, and Philippine firms First Balfour and DMCI. Connecting Cebu City and Cordova, the  bridge is meant to serve an alternate route serving Mactan–Cebu International Airport, capable of serving at least 40,000 vehicles daily.

The  main span of the CCLEX is cable-stayed and are supported by  twin tower pylons. The design of the pylons were inspired from the historic Magellan's Cross Pavilion. The main span will have a  navigation clearance, which allow ships to traverse the bridge. Viaduct approach bridges and a causeway will also form part of the CCLEX, as well as toll road facilities on an artificial island. The toll facilities' design are inspired from the eight-rayed sun of the Philippine flag.

Toll 
The bridge expressway uses a barrier toll system, where motorists pay a fixed toll rate based on vehicle class. The toll plaza is located on an artificial island after the main bridge, serving as the only toll collection point of the expressway. Since its opening, cash is used for toll collection. An electronic toll collection (ETC) system was implemented on July 2, 2022.

The toll rates are as follows:

Extension
There are proposals for extensions of the expressway in a bid to increase traffic. If completed, the expansion will cost an estimated 1 billion and will provide a direct connection from Cebu City's central business districts to the CCLEX.

In the Mactan side, the expressway terminates near the barangays of Pilipog and Ibabao (both in Cordova), intersects the Babag II Road of Barangay Babag (in Lapu-Lapu City). From here, an extension is proposed through Lapu-Lapu City and a possible direct connection to Mactan–Cebu International Airport.

CCLEX is also eyed to be connected to the proposed Cebu–Bohol Bridge.

References

External links 

Roads in Cebu
Transportation in Cebu
Toll roads in the Philippines
Cable-stayed bridges
Bridges in the Philippines
Cable-stayed bridges in the Philippines
Bridges completed in 2022